Vinzaglio is a comune (municipality) in the Province of Novara in the Italian region Piedmont, located about  northeast of Turin and about  southwest of Novara. It is an agricultural borough in the rice-growing plain of Vercelli.

Vinzaglio borders the following municipalities: Borgo Vercelli, Casalino, Confienza, Palestro and Vercelli. The Battle of Palestro was fought near the town on 30–31 May 1859.

References

Cities and towns in Piedmont